"Let It Out (Let It All Hang Out)" is a 1967 song by the Hombres and the title track of their album of the same name. It is, according to AllMusic journalist Stewart Mason, a "deadpan southern-fried parody" of Bob Dylan's "Subterranean Homesick Blues".

Background
The song's spoken intro – "A preachment, dear friends, you are about to receive on John Barleycorn, nicotine and the temptations of Eve" – dates to the 1947 novelty recording "Cigareetes, Whuskey and Wild, Wild Women" by Red Ingle and His Natural Seven, and is followed by a raspberry.

Go Girl, Go
The song's B-side, "Go Girl, Go", has the singer complaining about having to "stand in line" to see his girlfriend now that she is a "hip-swingin', fringe-slingin' Watusi go go girl". It is featured in the compilation album Essential Pebbles, Volume 1, where it is incorrectly titled "Go Go Girl" in the track listing, and attributed to "unknown artist".

Cover versions

In 1970, Jonathan King reached number 26 in the UK Singles Chart with his rendition.
 In 1984, the Nails included it on their debut album Mood Swing.
 In 1988, Scrawl released it (with amended lyrics) on their album He's Drunk.
 In 1989 John Cougar Mellencamp recorded it for his Big Daddy LP. A music video featured Sports Illustrated "swimsuit issue" cover model Ashley Richardson.

Uses in popular culture
 One of the earliest uses of the song was when it was sampled in 1968 by Dickie Goodman for his single "Washington Uptight."
 It was sampled by the London based dance-music act Definition of Sound on their top 20 hit "Wear Your Love Like Heaven", in 1991.
 It was featured on the 1998 box set Nuggets: Original Artyfacts from the First Psychedelic Era, 1965–1968.
 "Let It All Hang Out" was included on the soundtrack of the 2005 film Elizabethtown.
 Foster's Lager used it in a 2006 advertisement for Foster's Twist.

Chart performance

References

1967 songs
1967 singles
1970 singles
Novelty songs
Jonathan King songs
Song recordings produced by Huey P. Meaux
Song recordings produced by Jonathan King
Verve Forecast Records singles
Decca Records singles